Rambai may refer to:

Baccaurea motleyana, a type of plant
Kampong Rambai, a village in Mukim Rambai, Brunei
Mukim Rambai, a mukim of Brunei
Sungai Rambai, a mukim of Malaysia
Seri Rambai, a historical Dutch cannon in Penang, Malaysia